Carnegie High School may refer to:
 Carnegie Vanguard High School, Houston, Texas
 Carnegie High School (Oklahoma), Carnegie, Oklahoma